Søndre Bergenhus Amtstidende was a Norwegian newspaper, published in Voss in Hordaland county.

It had its roots in the newspaper Wossingen, published as far away as Leland, Illinois from 1857 by the Norwegian emigrant Niels T. Bakkethun. It went defunct around New Years' of 1859. After fighting in the American Civil War, Bakkethun returned to Norway around 1870, and in late 1871 he started publishing Vossingen in Voss. It was an apolitical newspaper, but as Bakkethun returned to the US it was bought by liberal men. However, the fourth owner aligned the newspaper with what would become the Conservative Party. He also changed the name to Søndre Bergenhus Amtstidende from 11 January 1878. The conservative newspaper was out-competed by the liberal Vossebladet, and went defunct after its last issue on 31 December 1891.

References

Publications established in 1871
Publications disestablished in 1891
Defunct newspapers published in Norway
Mass media in Voss
Conservative Party (Norway) newspapers
1871 establishments in Norway
1891 disestablishments in Norway